Visakhapatnam Steel Plant is the integrated steel plants of Rashtriya Ispat Nigam Limited in Visakhapatnam. Founded in 1971, the plant focuses on producing value-added steel, producing 5.773 million tonnes of hot metal, 5.272 million tonnes of crude steel and 5.138 million tonnes of saleable steel in the 2021-2022 financial year. According to the India Daily Times, the plant is expected to skyrocket in terms of production in the nearest future.

History

On 17 April 1970, the Prime Minister of India, the Indira Gandhi, announced the government's decision to establish a steel plant at Visakhapatnam. With the offer of assistance from the government of the erstwhile USSR, a revised project evolved some years later.  A detailed project report for a plant with a capacity of 3.4 Mtpa was prepared in November 1980 and in February 1981, a contract was signed with the USSR for the preparation of working drawings of coke ovens, blast furnace and sinter plant. The blast furnace foundation was laid, with first mass concreting, in January 1982. The construction of the local township was also started at the same time.

In the 1970s, Kurupam Zamindars donated 6,000 acres of land for Vizag Steel Plant. A new company Rashtriya Ispat Nigam Limited (RINL) was formed on 18 February 1982. Visakhapatnam Steel Plant was separated from SAIL and RINL was made the corporate entity of Visakhapatnam Steel Plant in April 1982.

Turnover in 2011-2012 was Rs 14,457 crores. On 20 May 2009, Prime Minister Manmohan Singh launched the expansion project of Visakhapatnam Steel Plant from a capacity of 3.6 MT to 6.3 MT at a cost of Rs. 8,692 crores. But the investment was revised to 14,489 crores with the following classification:
 Expenditure for the financial year 2009-10 Rs 1840 crores.
 Rs 5883 crores since inception of the project.
 Total commitment, including enabling works, steel procurement, consultancy, spares, etc. is Rs 11591 crores as of 25 March 2010.

The expansion project is expected to become functional by 2012. Currently, the steel plant has completed the expansion from 3.6 MT to 6.3 MT with a total investment of Rs.12,300 crore. The company has planned to expand its production capacity further by one more MT which requires an investment of Rs.4,500 crore.

Infrastructure

 Coke Ovens and Coal Chemical Plant
 Sinter plant
 Blast furnace
 Calcining and Refractory Material Plant
 Steel Melt Shop and Continuous Casting
 Light and Medium Merchant Mill
 Medium Merchant and Structural Mill
 Wire rod mill
 Steel melt shop
 THERMAL power plant

Coke ovens and coal chemical plants
Functions

 Coke Dry Cooling Plant
 Coke Chemical Plant (CCP)
 Gas Condensation Section
 Ammonium Sulphate Section
 Final Gas Cooling and Naphthalene Washing
 Benzol Recovery
 Dry Purification Unit
 Tar Distillation Plant

From the store yard, the coking coal is sent to foreign material removing section to
remove foreign matter of above 150 mm size. Iron traps for ferromagnetic articles and cylindrical screens are provided for this. 16 nos of bins each 800 tonnes capacity are provided along with continuous action feeders of up to 100 tonnes per hour capacity each.
After blending the material is crushed to take care of petrographic non-uniformity, high hardness and mineral content of crushed and blended coal (74-78% of 3mm size is conveyed to two coal towers each of 4000 T capacity. Weighbridges are provided under coal towers to weigh the coal charge. system of pneumatic blow down of blend is provided in the coal tower to take care of jamming of coal.

Battery

The prepared coal charge in the coal tower is drawn by a charging car on the top of the batteries and charged into the ovens as per sequence. The charged coal is gradually heated by the heating wall of the oven in the absence of air to attain a temperature of 1000°-1050 °C at the central axis of the coke mass toward the end of coking period. the coking period is generally specified between 16 hrs and 19 hrs depending on oven condition and production requirement. the volatile matter of coal liberated during carbonization is collected in gas collecting mains in the form of raw coke oven gas passing through stand pipes and direct contact cooling with ammonia liquor spray. The gas cooled from 800 °C is drawn to coal chemical plant by exhauster. The residual coke is pushed out of the oven by pusher car through a guide into coke bucket. The red-hot coke is taken to coke dry cooling plant for cooling. There are 4 batteries, each having 67 ovens each.  Each oven can hold 32 tons of dry coal charge. The volumetric capacity of each oven is 41.6 cum the heat for carbonation is supplied by under firing of coke oven gas having CV of 4200 Kcal/Nm3 of mixture of BF gas & CO gas having 900 Kcal/Nm3. The heating system of batteries is of under jet, compound type having twin-heating flues with re-circulation of waste gases.

Accidents
On 13 June 2012, 19 people died during a trial run of recently commissioned oxygen plant, due to a massive explosion in the plant. Union Steel Minister Beni Prasad Verma visited and announced  Ex gratia to each person.
 In June 2014, two engineers were fatally injured in a suspected case of Carbon monoxide poisoning.
On 7 Nov 2014, a minor explosion occurred in the Blast Furnace II but there were no casualties.
In February 2015, an assistant general manager was involved in a fatal accident when he fell into a rotating drum.
On 18 January 2019, a hot metal pipe was exploded in Blast furnace number 3. There were no casualties.

Township
The Visakhapatnam Steel Plant Township (VSPT), also known as Ukkunagaram was developed on 8000 acres of land, providing housing and accommodations for many of the employees. The township has 8200 dwellings spread over 12 sectors and 3900 acres, as well as a green belt of 4260 acres. The town also has multiple temples, churches, a mosque, gurudwara, athletic facilities, hospital, police station, post office, shopping malls, schools, indoor and outdoor stadiums. Some of the most famous temples include the Shivalayam, Goddess Kali temple, Venkateshwara temple, Shirdi Baba temple, Puri Jagannadh temple, Tri-Shakti temple, Ayyapa temple, and the Sathya Sai Baba Mandir. Besides, there are marriage halls and clubs for conducting various activities for entertainment such as screening of movies, hosting parties, felicitating people and celebrating festivals.

References

External links

 

Steel plants of India
Economy of Visakhapatnam
India–Soviet Union relations
Buildings and structures in Visakhapatnam
Soviet foreign aid
Uttarandhra
1971 establishments in Andhra Pradesh